Motoball (also known as motorcycle polo) is a motorsport similar to association football, with the main differences being that all players (except goalkeepers) are riding motorcycles, and the ball is much bigger. Motorcycle polo first began as an officially organized sport in the mid-1930s. In France, there are organized motoball competitions, and the sport was included in the inaugural Goodwill Games.

Rules and regulations
Motoball is played in a 5v5 format. There are four players on motorcycles, and one on their feet as the goalkeeper. The matches are split up into four 20-minute periods. There is only one spot on the field the motorcycles are not allowed to go, which is the semicircle in front of the goal. The riders use special prepared GasGas two-stroke 250 cc motorcycles for the game. At the sides of the bike, special frames are mounted, so riders can pinch the ball between their bike and their leg. Motul is supporting the Mettalurg team in terms of lubricants for the bikes, busses and the vans. Referees are in place to control the game and make sure penalties are called.

Commission of French Motoball
Pascale Reschko Jacquot has been president of the French Motoball Commission since 2012. In the latest FIM Europe Management Council, which was held in Fiumicino, Italy, she was appointed as president of the FIM Europe Motoball Commission. It was the first time in FIM Europe history that a woman was elected president of a European Commission. The commission of French Motoball is in charge of setting rule changes and hiring referees to officiate the games.

References

1986 Goodwill Games
Motorcycle sport
Association football variants
Team sports
Games and sports introduced in the 1930s